Weedon is a municipality of 2,683 people in Le Haut-Saint-François Regional County Municipality, in Quebec, Canada.

On February 9, 2000, the village municipality of Saint-Gérard merged into Weedon.

References

External links
 

Municipalities in Quebec
Incorporated places in Estrie
Le Haut-Saint-François Regional County Municipality